The Barnegat Township School District is a comprehensive community public school district that serves students in kindergarten through twelfth grade from Barnegat Township, in Ocean County, New Jersey, United States.

As of the 2017-18 school year, the district and its six schools had an enrollment of 3,189 students and 277.0 classroom teachers (on an FTE basis), for a student–teacher ratio of 11.5:1.

The district is classified by the New Jersey Department of Education as being in District Factor Group "CD", the third-lowest of eight groupings. District Factor Groups organize districts statewide to allow comparison by common socioeconomic characteristics of the local districts. From lowest socioeconomic status to highest, the categories are A, B, CD, DE, FG, GH, I and J.

Schools
Schools in the district (with 2017-18 enrollment data from the National Center for Education Statistics) are:
Cecil S. Collins Elementary School (472 students; in grades K-5)
Patrick Magee, Principal
Joseph T. Donahue Elementary School (220; K-5)
Josh Toddings, Principal 
Lillian M. Dunfee Elementary School (387; K-5)
John Fiorentino, Principal 
Robert L. Horbelt Elementary School (419; K-5)
Dr. Joseph Saxton, Principal
Middle school
Russell O. Brackman Middle School for grades 6-8 (720)
Shannon Smith, Principal
Barnegat High School for grades 9-12 (937)
Stephen J. Nichol, Principal

Barnegat High School opened in September 2004 with a freshman class, adding a new class each subsequent year until all four grades were populated. The last group of students from Barnegat completed twelfth grade at Southern Regional High School in Stafford Township at the end of the 2006-07 school year through a now-ended sending/receiving relationship with the Southern Regional School District.

Administration
Core members of the district's administration are:

Dr. Brian Latwis, Superintendent
Stephen J. Brennan, Business Administrator / Board Secretary

The district's board of education has nine members who set policy and oversee the fiscal and educational operation of the district through its administration. As a Type II school district, the board's trustees are elected directly by voters to serve three-year terms of office on a staggered basis, with three seats up for election each year held (since 2012) as part of the November general election.

References

External links
Barnegat Township School District

School Data for the Barnegat Township School District, National Center for Education Statistics

Barnegat Township, New Jersey
New Jersey District Factor Group CD
School districts in Ocean County, New Jersey